The Bílina rises on the slopes of the Ore Mountains in the Czech Republic, north of Chomutov. The river flows between the Czech Central Mountains and the Ore Mountains to the north-east, and empties into the Elbe in Ústí nad Labem.

The catchment area of the river covers an area of 1,082 km², and its total length is 82.0 km. In the upper part it flows through a man-made riverbed which was created when lignite mining in the area around Most started. At the same time, the former Lake Komořany was drained.

A substantial part of the flow was extracted for use in chemical plants in Záluží u Litvínova. The highly polluted output killed all fish. The situation improved significantly during the 1990s. The flow rate is currently artificially increased by redirection of water from the catchment area of the Ohře. However, the Bílina is still one of the most polluted rivers in the Czech Republic.

For most of the river's length it flows through open, treeless countryside. The river bed is 5 to 10 metres wide, mostly regulated. The river has no major tributaries. Towns located on the river include Jirkov, Most, Bílina and Ústí nad Labem.

References

Rivers of the Ústí nad Labem Region
Most District
Chomutov District
Teplice District
Ústí nad Labem District